Gare de Longroy-Gamaches (Longroy-Gamaches Station) is a French railway station in the commune of Longroy in the Seine-Maritime department near Gamaches in the Somme department.

The station is served by TER Hauts-de-France trains from Beauvais to Le Tréport-Mers.

History
The Gare de Longroy-Gamaches formerly provided a connection to Longpré-les-Corps-Saints. This single-track line opened on 9 May 1872 and was degraded on 10 November 1993. Between Longpré-les-Corps-Saints and Longroy-Gamaches it served Bettencourt-Rivière, Airaines, Allery, Wiry-au-Mont, Forceville, Oisemont, Cerisy-Buleux, Martainneville–Saint-Maxent, Vismes-au-Val, Maisnières and Gamaches.

See also 
 List of SNCF stations in Normandy

References

Railway stations in Seine-Maritime
Railway stations in France opened in 1872